Caoimhín King is a Gaelic footballer from Meath. He plays with his local club Dunshaughlin and has been a senior member of the Meath county squad since 2005.

References

Year of birth missing (living people)
Living people
Dunshaughlin Gaelic footballers
Meath inter-county Gaelic footballers